The St. John the Baptist Church is an Macedonian Orthodox church in the neighbourhood of Novo Selo, Štip. The church is registered as a Cultural Heritage site of North Macedonia.

The church is located high on the rocks in the suburb of Novo Selo, on the right bank of the river Otinja.

History
The church was built in 1350 with the support of Jovan Probištipovikj (Jovan of Probištip) at a time when the land was owned by the despot Jovan Oliver.

Features
It is a small single-nave church without a dome. The south façade is decorated with lizens, and above the west entrance there is a profiled niche similar to the one on the south side, in which there is a fresco by the patron John the Baptist. Only insignificant fragments of the frescoes are preserved - the representation of Saints Constantine and Helena on the southern wall.

Gallery

See also
 Dormition of the Theotokos Church - the seat of Novo Selo Parish and a cultural heritage site
 Ascension of Christ Church - a cultural heritage site
 Holy Trinity Church - the cemetery church and a cultural heritage site
 Novo Selo School - the building of the former school and the present seat of the Rectorate of the Goce Delčev University. It is also a cultural heritage site

References

External Links
 The official website of Breganica Diocese

Churches in North Macedonia
Cultural heritage of North Macedonia